is a passenger railway station located in the city of Uwajima, Ehime Prefecture, Japan. It is operated by JR Shikoku and has the station number "G43".

Lines

Layout
The station, which is unstaffed, consists of a side platform serving a single track. A shelter is provided on the platform for waiting passengers. A flight of steps is needed to reach the platform from the access road and the station is thus not wheelchair accessible. A parking area and bike shed are provided.

Adjacent stations

History
With the nationalization of the Uwajima Railway on 1 August 1933, the station came under the control of Japanese Government Railways (JGR), later becoming Japanese National Railways (JNR) and was renamed Futana.

With the privatization of JNR on 1 April 1987, control passed to JR Shikoku.

Surrounding area
Ehime Prefectural Route 283 passes in front of the station. Although the surrounding fields are widely spread, private houses are also scattered. There is a kamaboko factory on the southeast side of the station.

See also
 List of railway stations in Japan

References

External links
Station timetable

Railway stations in Ehime Prefecture
Yodo Line
Railway stations in Japan opened in 1914
Uwajima, Ehime